Spain Park High School (SPHS) is a four-year public high school in the Birmingham, Alabama, suburb of Hoover. It is the smaller of two high schools in the Hoover City School System. School colors are Carolina blue, black, and white, and the athletic teams are called the Jaguars. SPHS competes in AHSAA Class 7A athletics.

Recognition 
SPHS is consistently recognized as one of the best high schools in Alabama:
 SPHS is one of 12 schools in Alabama to be included in the Washington Post's 2015 list of America's Most Challenging High Schools.
 SchoolDigger ranks SPHS 8th among 365 high schools in the state of Alabama and 3rd among high schools in the Birmingham-Hoover metropolitan area.
 Niche ranks SPHS 4th in the state of Alabama and 3rd among high schools in the Birmingham-Hoover metropolitan area.
 The U.S. Department of Education has recognized SPHS as a National Blue Ribbon School and awarded it the National Blue Ribbon Schools of Excellence Award.

Student Profile 
Enrollment in grades 9–12 for the 2019-20 school year was 1,634 students. Approximately 61% of students are white, 20% are African-American, 6% are Asian-American, 8% are Hispanic, and 5% are multiracial. Roughly 18% of students qualify for free or reduced price lunch.

SPHS has a graduation rate of 92%. Ninety-eight percent of its students meet or exceed proficiency standards in both reading and mathematics. The average ACT score for SPHS students is 24.

Athletics
SPHS competes in AHSAA Class 7A athletics and fields teams in the following sports:
 Baseball
 Basketball
 Bowling
 Cheerleading
 Cross Country
 Dance
 Football
 Golf
 Indoor Track & Field
 Lacrosse
 Outdoor Track & Field
 Soccer
 Softball
 Swimming and Diving
 Tennis
 Volleyball
 Wrestling
SPHS has won state championships in the following sports:
 Lacrosse (2011, 2012, 2015, 2016)
 Baseball (2014)
 Boys' golf (2008, 2009, 2010, 2012, 2013, 2014, 2016)
 Girls' golf (2009, 2017)
 Boys' indoor track and field (2012)
 Girls' soccer (2004, 2009, 2010, 2011)
 Boys' tennis (2007)
 Boys' bowling (2016, 2017)
 Girls' basketball (2018)
Spain Park's football team was shown on MTV's television program Two-A-Days, as an opponent of arch-rival Hoover High. The team also advanced to the "Super Six" Class 6A final game of the Alabama High School Athletic Association football championship in 2007, losing to defending champion Prattville High School (which defeated Hoover in the 2006 finals).

Notable alumni
 Simone Charley – National Women's Soccer League player for the Portland Thorns
 Chris Ellis – Major League Baseball player.
 Tyler Grisham – National Football League player for the Pittsburgh Steelers
 Michael Jackson – National Football League player for the Seattle Seahawks
 Nick Mullens – National Football League player for the Las Vegas Raiders

References

External links

SPHS website

Public high schools in Alabama
Educational institutions established in 2001
Hoover, Alabama
Schools in Shelby County, Alabama
2001 establishments in Alabama